The following is a list of awards and nominations received by Australian actor Cate Blanchett. Among her numerous accolades for her performances, she has received two Academy Awards, nine AACTA Awards, four BAFTA Awards, four Critics' Choice Movie Awards, four Golden Globe Awards, four Helpmann Awards, three Independent Spirit Awards, three Screen Actors Guild Awards, and awards from the Los Angeles Film Critics Association, National Board of Review, National Society of Film Critics, New York Film Critics Circle, and Venice Film Festival. Her performance as Katharine Hepburn in The Aviator, made her the only actor to win an Oscar for portraying another Oscar-winning actor. Blanchett is only the third female actor, after Meryl Streep and Jessica Lange, to win Best Actress after winning Best Supporting Actress. She is the only female actor (and one of only six actors) in Academy Award history to be nominated twice for portraying the same role in two films (Elizabeth I in the films Elizabeth and Elizabeth: The Golden Age) and one of 12 actors to receive two acting nominations in the same year. She is also the only Australian to win two acting Oscars.

Blanchett received Premiere magazine's Icon Award in 2006. In 2008, she received the Santa Barbara International Film Festival Modern Master Award in recognition of her accomplishments in the film industry. Also in 2008, she was inducted into the Hollywood Walk of Fame with a motion pictures star at 6712 Hollywood Boulevard. She received Women in Film and Television International's Crystal Award for excellence in the entertainment industry in 2014. In 2015, Blanchett was honoured at the Museum of Modern Art's Film Benefit for her outstanding contributions to the industry. She received the British Film Institute Fellowship in recognition of her outstanding contribution to film, presented to her by fellow actor Ian McKellen. Blanchett was the recipient of the AACTA Longford Lyell Award for her "outstanding contribution to the enrichment of Australia's screen environment and culture". In 2016, she received the Costume Designers Guild Lacoste Spotlight Award, in honour of an "enduring commitment to excellence" and her "appreciation for the artistry of costume design and collaboration with the Costume Designers".

In June 2017, Blanchett was named a Companion of the Order of Australia in the Queen's Birthday Honours, for services to the performing arts and as a supporter of humanitarian and environmental causes, which entitles her to use the post-nominal letters "AC" after her name. Blanchett was appointed Chevalier of the Order of Arts and Letters by the French Minister of Culture in 2012, in recognition of her significant contributions to the arts. Blanchett was awarded the Centenary Medal for Service to Australian Society by the Australian government. She has been presented with a Doctor of Letters from University of Sydney, University of New South Wales, and Macquarie University, in recognition of her extraordinary contribution to the arts, philanthropy, and the community.

Major associations

Academy Awards

British Academy Film Awards

Golden Globe Awards

Primetime Emmy Awards

Screen Actors Guild Awards

Tony Awards

Other awards and nominations

State and academic honours

See also
 Cate Blanchett on screen and stage
 List of Academy Award records
 List of actors with two or more Academy Awards in acting categories
 List of actors nominated for two Academy Awards in the same year
 List of actors with two or more Academy Award nominations in acting categories
 List of actors with Academy Award nominations
 List of stars on the Hollywood Walk of Fame
 List of actors with Hollywood Walk of Fame motion picture stars

Notes

References

External links
 
 Academy Award Best Actress Facts & Trivia at Filmsite.org, AMC
 Academy Award Best Supporting Actress Facts & Trivia at Filmsite.org, AMC

Cate Blanchett
Blanchett, Cate